Noriko Nakayama (née Takagi; born 1943) is a Japanese former badminton player, the first true international badminton star from that nation, who won numerous Japanese national and major international titles from the mid-1960s to the early 1970s. 

Nakayama claimed seven of these at the Danish Open, two in singles and five in women's doubles. She was the champion at World Invitational Championships held in Glasgow, in 1969 in Women's doubles category with Hiroe Amano. At the prestigious All-England Championships she shared the women's doubles title with her compatriot and singles rival Hiroe Yuki in 1971, and won the singles title over Yuki in 1972, having previously lost twice in the finals. She also won the women's singles event at the Olympic Games Demonstration in 1972. In four successive Uber Cup (women's international team) competitions, between 1965 and 1975 she was unbeaten in singles, thus leading the way to three world team titles for Japan. With the birth of her eldest daughter, she hung her racket in 1975. As of 2017, she is still actively associated with the sport, coaching at the local level.

Achievements

Olympic Games (demonstration)

Asian Games

International tournaments

References 

1943 births
Living people
Japanese female badminton players
Asian Games medalists in badminton
Badminton players at the 1972 Summer Olympics
Badminton players at the 1966 Asian Games
Asian Games gold medalists for Japan
Asian Games bronze medalists for Japan
Medalists at the 1966 Asian Games
20th-century Japanese women